Diceroprocta apache, the citrus cicada, is a species of cicada in the family Cicadidae. It is found in Central America and North America.

Life Cycle
Their median life cycle from egg to natural adult death is around three to four years.

References

Further reading

External links

 

Diceroprocta
Articles created by Qbugbot
Insects described in 1921